Boise Hempfest is an annual cannabis rights activism activity and festival in Boise, Idaho; held since 2016. The "Hempfest" name is licensed by Seattle Hempfest. The coordinator of the inaugural and subsequent events was Serra Frank. The fourth annual event took place on April 20th, 2019. The 2020 event was scheduled for April 18th, 2020; but was postponed due to the Idaho government mandated  "stay at home order" issued at the beginning of the COVID-19 Pandemic. The next event is scheduled for Saturday, August 14th, 2021, in Julia Davis Park.

The event is approved and permitted annually through the City of Boise Department of Parks and Recreation. It is dubbed a free and family friendly "Cannabis Education Event" that offers 12 hours of live entertainment and speakers from the Julia Davis Park bandshell; numerous food trucks and vendors in a "Munchies Market"; informational, non-profit, craft, and commercial vendors in a "Vendor Village"; access to local activism groups and citizens initiatives in a "Cannabis Cove"; educational displays in an "Enchanted Forest"; educational presentations in a "Hemposium"; and children-oriented activities and games in a free "Kidland."

See also
 Cannabis in Idaho

References

External links

2016 establishments in Idaho
Cannabis events in the United States
Culture of Boise, Idaho
Events in Idaho
Recurring events established in 2016